Jovica Milijić (born 20 January 1986) is a Serbian-born Maltese futsal player, currently playing for Valletta, the reigning champions of Maltese Futsal League. In 2017 he won the Malta Football Association's futsal player of the year.

Football career

Milijić made his first football steps with Timočanin in mid-1990s, becoming a member of the promising generation together with the brothers Marinković, Nebojša Marinković and Nenad Marinković.

Soon after family relocation to Malta in 1999, he joined Pietà Hotspurs, a Maltese club famous for producing talented footballers in its youth school.

Futsal career

European Pilot Academy
The first touch with futsal Milijić had in the jersey of European Pilot Academy's futsal club (formerly known as Serbia)  where he won his first trophy - Maltese Futsal Cup for the season 2006/07. Also, Milijić was close to win his first championship as that season European Pilot Academy was a point behind the title winner Jeepers Handyman Centre.

Aluserv Futsal Club
After a successful debutant season, Milijić joined newly promoted futsal top tier Aluserv. The team that were made for an instant success won the league and cup  but were defeated in the play-off semi-final, just like in the season 2008–09.

Scandals
His UEFA competition debut was at 2008–09 UEFA Futsal Cup preliminary round against Slovenian 2008 champion Gorica on 23 August 2008. The match was played in Helsinki and Scandals were heavy defeated (0-11).

Paola Downtowns
During his stay in Paola Downtowns, Milijić was named for the top scorer of 2010-11 Maltese Futsal First Division with 42 goals. The same season he was nominated for the best futsal player but the award went in the hands of the Romanian Anton Florin.

Naxxar Motors

Lija Athletics

Before the start of the 2012/13 season, Lija Athletic replaced Naxxar Motors and Milijić became a captain of the newly formed club. He even scored a hattrick on his debut against Valletta (7-1). Although Lija Athletic had the highest ambitions, the cup journey was ended yet in the quarter-final and play-off was missed, for the first time in Milijić's career.

Balzan

Next season Milijić changed Lija Athletics for Balzan and the first trophy came soon after. Hibernians was heavily defeated (5-1) with Milijić among the scorers. That was the introduction in a very successful season where Balzan won all possible trophies.

Hamrun Spartans

Valletta

Milijić joined Valletta FC Futsal in June 2015 as an experienced player that has won every possible honor.
 He was a key figure in Valletta's march to the national title. His best game in the regular part of the season was in March in a derby against his ex-club Lija Athletic, when he scored four goals in a 7–4 win. During the first season with Valletta he scored 18 goals in the Gatorade Futsal League.
Next season Milijić added 21 goals.

Malta national futsal team

In 2012 Milijić became a naturalized Maltese citizen and soon after started playing for the national futsal team. He had a debut in a heavy defeat against Georgia (0-9) in UEFA Futsal Euro 2014 qualifying at home ground in Paola, Malta on January 23, 2013. He was also in the starting line up against Moldova recording one more loss (1-4).

In 2014 Malta played only friendly games, three of them against Gibraltar (3-4, 4-2 and 1-0) and Serbia (1-4), Milijić participated in all of them scoring two goals and a few more times he was close to score hitting only the post, most notably against his homeland Serbia.

Next year Malta participated in the qualification for Euro 2016 and then the qualification for World Cup. The team lost all six games, three in each tournament, by the order: England (0-3), Andorra (0-4), Latvia (0-8), then France (2-8), Lithuania (1-2) and Albania (3-6). Milijić took a part in all matches and scored in the last two.

Between two tournaments, Malta went to San Marino and recorded two wins (5-1 and 5-3) with Milijić in the squad. He earned two more caps next year against the same national team, this time in Paola (4-0 and 2-2).

At the beginning of the last year, with Milijić in the starting five, Malta lost all three games in UEFA Futsal Euro 2018 qualifying tournament held in Bulgaria, against England (1-6), Bulgaria (1-6) and Albania (2-3).

Since his debut five years ago, Milijić has not missed any national team match, recording 19 caps and 4 goals in total.

International caps

International goals
Scores and results list Malta's goal tally first

Personal life

Besides his mother tongue, Serbian, Milijić speaks four other languages: English, Maltese, Italian and Russian.

Honours

Club

European Pilot Academy

Maltese Futsal Cup: 2006-07 

Aluserv

Maltese Futsal Cup: 2007-08

References

1986 births
People from Knjaževac
Serbian men's futsal players
Maltese men's futsal players
Living people